There are 28 universities in Telangana. Of these, there are 17 state universities, three deemed universities, three central and five private universities. The Osmania University is the largest in the state. It is also the oldest university in the state, established in 1918.

Apart from the universities, there are several research and educational institutes in Telangana. These include four institutes of national importance, which are the AIIMS Bibinagar, IIT Hyderabad, NIPER Hyderabad, and NIT Warangal.

Universities

Out-of-state universities 

 Birla Institute of Technology and Science, Pilani (deemed, Rajasthan) has a campus in Hyderabad.
 Gandhi Institute of Technology and Management (GITAM) (deemed, Andhra Pradesh) has a campus in Hyderabad.
 Tata Institute of Fundamental Research (deemed, Maharashtra) has a campus in Hyderabad
 Tata Institute of Social Sciences (deemed, Maharashtra) has a campus in Hyderabad.

Major educational and research institutes

Institutes of National Importance

Other Institutes 
 Central Institute of Tool Design, Hyderabad
 Centre for Economic and Social Studies (CESS), Hyderabad
 Indian School of Business (ISB), Hyderabad
Central Research Institute for Dryland Agriculture (CRIDA), ICAR, Hyderabad
 Centre for Cellular and Molecular Biology (CCMB), Hyderabad
 Centre for DNA Fingerprinting and Diagnostics (CDFD), Hyderabad
 Defence Metallurgical Research Laboratory (DMRL), Hyderabad
 Defence Research Development Organization (DRDO), Hyderabad
 Directorate of Poultry Research (DPR), ICAR, Hyderabad
 Directorate of Rice Research (DRR), ICAR, Hyderabad
 Indian Institute of Chemical Technology (IICT), Hyderabad
 Indian Institute of Millets Research (IIMR), ICAR, Hyderabad
 Indian Institute of Oilseeds Research (DOR), ICAR, Hyderabad
 International Crops Research Institute for the Semi-Arid Tropics (ICRISAT), Hyderabad
 National Academy of Agricultural Research Management (NAARM),  ICAR, Hyderabad
 National Bureau of Plant Genetic Resources (NBPGR), ICAR, Hyderabad
 National Geophysical Research Institute (NGRI), Hyderabad
National Institute of Agricultural Extension Management (MANAGE), Hyderabad
 National Institute of Fashion Technology, Hyderabad
 National Institute of Nutrition (NIN), Tarnaka, Hyderabad
National Institute of Plant Health Management (NIPHM), Hyderabad
 National Institute of Rural Development (NIRD)
 National Research Centre on Meat (NRCM), ICAR, Hyderabad

Medical colleges and research institutes 
Telangana State has 4600 MBBS seats for academic year 2019-20.

Government colleges
1600 seats are available in Government Colleges:

 Osmania Medical College, Koti, Hyderabad
 Gandhi Medical College, Musheerabad, Hyderabad
 Kakatiya Medical College, Warangal
 Rajiv Gandhi Institute of Medical Sciences, Adilabad
 Government Medical College, Nizamabad 
 Government Medical College, Mahbubnagar,
 ESI Medical College, Sanathnagar, Hyderabad 
 Government Medical College, Siddipet
 Government Medical College, Nalgonda
 Government Medical College, Suryapet
 All India Institute of Medical Sciences, Bibinagar

Private colleges
3050 seats are available in private colleges.

Private Un aided Non Minority Medical Colleges

 Mamatha Medical College, Khammam .
 Kamineni Institute of Medical Sciences, Narketpally, Nalgonda.
 S.V.S. Medical College, Yenugonda, Mahaboobnagar.
 Chalmeda Anand Rao Institute of Medical Sciences, Karimnagar.
 Prathima Institute of Medical Sciences, Narketpally, Karimnagar.
 Medicity Institute of Medical Sciences, Ghanpur, R.R. Dist.
 MNR Medical College and Hospital, Fasalwadi Sangareddy, Medak Dist.
 Bhaskar Medical College, Moinabad (M),R.R.Dist.
 Apollo Institute of Medical sciences and Research, Hyderabad .
 Kamineni Academy of Medical Sciences and Research Centre, LB Nagar, Hyderabad.
 RVM Medical College, Mulugu, Medak
 RVM Institute of Medical Sciences and Research Centre, Siddipet
 Surabhi Institute of Medical Sciences, Siddipet.
 Mamata Academy of Medical Sciences, Bachupally .
 Malla Reddy Institute of Medical Sciences, Hyderabad .
 Malla Reddy Medical College for Womens, Hyderabad .
 Mahavir Institute of Medical Sciences, Vikarabad .
 Dr.Patnam Mahendar Reddy Institute of Medical Sciences, Chevella, R.R.
 Maheshwari Medical College, Patancheru-Not permitted for 2019-20.

Private Un aided Minority Medical Colleges

 Deccan College of Medical Sciences, Hyderabad.
 Shadan Institute Of Medical Sciences, Hyderabad.
 Dr.VRK Woman’s Medical College, Aziz Nagar, Hyderabad.
 Ayaan Institute of Medical Sciences, Teaching Hospital and Research Centre, Kanaka Mamidi, R.R.Dist.

Design & Media Colleges 
 ICAT Design & Media College (on Hyderabad Campus)

References

Universities and colleges in Telangana
Education
Education in Telangana
Telangana